Zyablikovo is a rural locality (a village) in Soshnevskoye Rural Settlement, Ustyuzhensky District, Vologda Oblast, Russia. The population was two as of 2002.

Geography 
Zhukovo is the nearest rural locality.

References 

Rural localities in Ustyuzhensky District